The Samoan national cricket team is the men's team that represents Samoa in international cricket. They became an affiliate member of the International Cricket Council (ICC) in 2000. They competed in the Pacifica Championship in 2001 and 2002, hosting the tournament on the second occasion. They came 6th in 2001, and 5th in 2002. In 2005, they competed in the East Asia/Pacific Cup, finishing in last place, thus missing out on qualification for the 2011 World Cup. Since 2017, they became an associate member.

History
In February 1966, Prime Minister Fiamē Mataʻafa Faumuina Mulinuʻu II banned cricket from being played except on Wednesdays and Saturdays, stating it was distracting Samoans from cleaning up after a cyclone. A cricket match in Samoa in October 1977 ended in a fight in which two players were stabbed to death. According to the Papua New Guinea Post-Courier, "the row started after a player was bowled out and angrily hit the wicket with his bat".

2018–present
In April 2018, the ICC decided to grant full Twenty20 International (T20I) status to all its members. Therefore, all Twenty20 matches played between Samoa and other ICC members since 1 January 2019 has been a full T20I.

Samoa played their first T20I against Papua New Guinea during the 2019 Pacific Games.

Grounds

Tournaments

2011 East Asia-Pacific Division Two
Samoa hosted the East Asia-Pacific Division Two tournament from 4 to 7 April 2011. The tournament was part of a qualifying pyramid for the 2012 twenty-20 cricket world cup in Sri Lanka. The competing teams were as follows:

Samoa won the event, thus qualifying for the 2011 East Asia-Pacific Division 1.

2011 East Asia-Pacific Division 1
The East Asia-Pacific Division 1 was held in Papua New Guinea from 4 to 7 July 2011. Samoa finished 4th out of the 5 teams with 2 wins, upsetting Fiji in the opening game and beating Japan in the final round-robin game. They then lost their semi-final against PNG by 141 runs, then they beat Fiji for the second time in the tournament in the 3rd Place Play-off. The competing teams were:

2012 ICC World Cricket League Division Eight
The men's team qualified for the World Cricket League following good performances in the Oceania regional competitions. They hosted the 2012 ICC World Cricket League Division Eight in September 2012 after they were approved as hosts by the ICC.

Tournament history

ICC T20 World Cup East Asia-Pacific Qualifier
2005 ICC EAP Cricket Cup
2006 ICC EAP Cricket Trophy (One day)
2007 ICC EAP Cricket Trophy (One day)
2009 ICC EAP Cricket Trophy (One day)

2009
This was the first time that Twenty20 games were played in the EAP trophy. The matches were held from 17–18 September with the eight teams being split into two groups of four in which each team played the other three. The play-offs were based on the final standings from the group stage. The final was between Papua New Guinea and Fiji and Papua New Guinea won comfortably.

2011 ICC EAP Cricket Trophy (One day)
2011 EAP Trophy
2018–19-:3rd place(Group A Subregional qualifier)

Pacific Games
2003: 4th place
2007: Bronze medal
2019: Bronze medal

Records and statistics 

International Match Summary — Samoa

Last updated 18 March 2023

Twenty20 International 

 Highest team total: 157/9 v Cook Islands, on 13 September 2022 at Independence Park, Port Vila.
 Highest individual score: 63*, Dom Michael v Fiji, on 11 September 2022 at Independence Park, Port Vila.
 Best bowling figures in an innings: 3/18, Timezeen Rapi v Vanuatu, on 13 March 2023 at Albert Park Ground 1, Suva.

T20I record versus other nations

Records complete to T20I #2029. Last updated 18 March 2023.

Other records
For a list of selected international matches played by Samoa, see Cricket Archive.

Notable players

Benjamin Mailata
Dom Michael
Faasao Mulivai
Sean Solia
Ofisa Tonu'u

See also
 Samoa women's national cricket team
 Samoa T20I cricketers

References

Cricket in Samoa
National cricket teams
Cricket
Samoa in international cricket